Penngal is a 2000 Indian Tamil-language drama film directed by Raj Marudhu. The film stars Akash and Divyasree, with Santhoshi and Santhana Bharathi in supporting roles. Featuring music composed by Bharadwaj, the film was released on 8 December 2000.

Plot
A mother hides her daughter from the village pimp by enrolling her in an orphanage; when the daughter grows older, she goes back to the village to save other girls with the help of a reporter.

Cast
Akash as Bharath Nageswaran
Divyasree as Kaveri
Santhoshi as Amudhavalli
Santhana Bharathi
Manivannan
Ashwini
Sharmili
S. N. Parvathy
Vichithra

Production 
The producers of the film were unhappy after actress Divyasree broke an exclusivity contract and she signed on for a film opposite actor Murali amid production.

Soundtrack
The music composed by Bharadwaj.

Release
A reviewer from The Hindu wrote "films such as Penngal are required to make us a little more conscious of the social problems but they should be made with a little more care and sensitivity". The critic added "one must commend the director for taking on such a theme", as "he brings to focus every aspect of these women's miserable existence - the desperation and dejection on the faces when a son is born, the fear when their young daughter is forcefully `readied' for the `occasion', the poverty and the diseases and the ostracism from the rest of the world".

References

External links
 

2000 films
2000s Tamil-language films
Indian drama films
Indian feminist films
Films about women in India
Films scored by Bharadwaj (composer)
2000 directorial debut films